The Serdang Raya Utara MRT station is a mass rapid transit (MRT) station in Seri Kembangan, Selangor, Malaysia. It is one of the stations on the MRT Putrajaya Line.

The station is opened to the public on 16 March 2023.

Location
The station is next to the Sungai Besi toll plaza, where the paid zone of the PLUS toll road begins.

Nearby
Selangor Turf Club

Bus Services

Feeder buses

References

External links
 Serdang Raya North MRT Station | mrt.com.my
 Klang Valley Mass Rapid Transit website
 MRT Hawk-Eye View

Rapid transit stations in Selangor
Sungai Buloh-Serdang-Putrajaya Line